Novodonetske is a rural settlement in the Volnovakha Raion, Donetsk Oblast (province) of eastern Ukraine.

References

Rural settlements in Donetsk Oblast